Marjan Vidmar (born 1 July 1960) is a Slovenian biathlete. He competed in the 20 km individual event at the 1984 Winter Olympics.

References

1960 births
Living people
Slovenian male biathletes
Olympic biathletes of Yugoslavia
Biathletes at the 1984 Winter Olympics
Sportspeople from Ljubljana
20th-century Slovenian people